Goldblum is a surname. Notable people with the surname include:

 Amiram Goldblum (born 1945), Israeli chemist and activist
 Jeff Goldblum (born 1952), American actor

See also
 Goldbloom (Anglicized form)
 Goldblatt
 Goldfeld (surname)

Jewish surnames
German-language surnames
Yiddish-language surnames
Surnames from ornamental names